Matthew Hall Toynbee (born 29 November 1956) is a former New Zealand first-class cricketer for Central Districts.

Born in Nelson, Toynbee attended Nelson College from 1970 to 1974. He was a member of the school's 1st XI cricket team for four years, including two years as captain in 1973 and 1974.  He was Head Prefect in 1974 and was the college Fives champion in 1973 and 1974. He later taught at Nelson College between 1979 and 1981.

Toynbee  was a right-handed all-rounder who bowled offbreak deliveries which took 77 wickets to complement the 1943 runs he made at 24.59 in 56 first-class matches between 1977 and 1985, including one century. He also played one day cricket between 1979 and 1985, however in this he was much less successful, with only 143 runs at 10.21 and three wickets at 108.33.

References

1956 births
New Zealand cricketers
Central Districts cricketers
Cricketers from Nelson, New Zealand
Living people
People educated at Nelson College
Nelson College faculty